This is a list of notable streets in Minneapolis, Minnesota, United States.

Streets 

 38th Street (Minneapolis)
 Cedar Avenue
 Central Avenue
 Cheatham Avenue
 France Avenue
 Grand Rounds National Scenic Byway / Great River Road
 Hennepin Avenue
 Hiawatha Avenue
 Lake Street (Minneapolis)
 Lyndale Avenue
 Marq2 transit corridor
 Nicollet Avenue
 Nicollet Mall
 University Avenue (Minneapolis–Saint Paul)
 Victory Memorial Parkway
 Virginia Triangle
 Washington Avenue (Minneapolis)

Street intersections 

 50th & France
 George Floyd Square (38th and Chicago)
 Lyn-Lake

See also 

 List of lakes in Minneapolis
 Trails in Minneapolis

Geography of Hennepin County, Minnesota
Minnesota geography-related lists
 
Streets in Minnesota